Mario Costa may refer to:

 Mario Costa (diplomat) (born 1951), Maltese diplomat and former Ambassador of Malta to Russia
 Mario Costa (philosopher) (born 1936), Italian philosopher
 Mario Costa (director) (1904–1995)
 Mario Pasquale Costa (1858–1933), Italian composer
 Mário Teixeira Costa (born 1970), Portuguese footballer